Kraljevec  may refer to:

 Kraljevec, Zagreb, a neighborhood in Gornji Grad - Medveščak district, Zagreb, Croatia
 Sesvetski Kraljevec, a neighborhood of Sesvete, wider City of Zagreb area, Croatia
 Kupinečki Kraljevec, a village in the far southern end of City of Zagreb area, Croatia
 Kraljevec na Sutli, a village in Zagorje, Croatia
 Donji Kraljevec, a village in Međimurje, Croatia
 Gornji Kraljevec, a village in Međimurje, Croatia

See also
 Kraljevac (disambiguation)
 Kraljevci (disambiguation)